Patrick Shanahan may refer to:

 Patrick M. Shanahan (born 1962), former acting United States Secretary of Defense
 Patrick Shanahan (politician) (1908–2000), Irish Fianna Fáil politician
 Patrick Shanahan (Medal of Honor) (1867–1937), United States Navy sailor
 Patrick Shanahan, drummer for Rick Nelson's Stone Canyon Band and for the New Riders of the Purple Sage